Stephen Baker may refer to:

 Stephen Baker (American football) (born 1964), football player
 Stephen Baker (animal behaviorist) (1921–2004), animal behaviorist and humorist of Austrian origin
 Stephen Baker (Australian politician) (born 1946), former South Australian House of Assembly politician
 Stephen Baker (banker) (1859–1946), American banker and president of the Bank of the Manhattan Company 
 Stephen Baker (merchant) (1772–1833), American merchant
 Stephen Baker (New York politician) (1819–1875), U.S. Representative
 Stephen D. Baker, colonel in the 6th New York Heavy Artillery Regiment (1862–1865)
 Stephen L. Baker (born 1955), journalist and author of the non-fiction book The Numerati

See also 
 Steven Baker (disambiguation) for Steven Baker or Steve Baker